Maria João Koehler failed to defend her title from 2012, losing to Ukrainian Nadiya Kichenok in the final, 6–4, 7–5.

Seeds

Main draw

Finals

Top half

Bottom half

References 
 Main draw

President's Cup - Women's Singles
2013 Women's Singles